The 2022 Lexington Challenger was a professional tennis tournament played on outdoor hard courts. It was the twenty-seventh edition of the tournament which was part of the 2022 ATP Challenger Tour, and the twenty-fifth edition of the tournament which was part of the 2022 ITF Women's World Tennis Tour. It took place in Lexington, Kentucky, United States between 1 and 7 August 2022.

Champions

Men's singles

  Shang Juncheng def.  Emilio Gómez 6–4, 6–4.

Men's doubles

  Yuki Bhambri /  Saketh Myneni def.  Gijs Brouwer /  Aidan McHugh 3–6, 6–4, [10–8].

Women's singles

  Katie Swan def.  Jodie Burrage, 6–0, 3–6, 6–3

Women's doubles

  Aldila Sutjiadi /  Kateryna Volodko def.  Jada Hart /  Dalayna Hewitt, 7–5, 6–3

Men's singles main draw entrants

Seeds 

 1 Rankings as of 25 July 2022.

Other entrants 
The following players received a wildcard into the singles main draw:
  Millen Hurrion
  Aleksandar Kovacevic
  Evan Zhu

The following player received entry into the singles main draw using a protected ranking:
  Andrew Harris

The following players received entry into the singles main draw as alternates:
  Govind Nanda
  Mukund Sasikumar
  Mikael Torpegaard

The following players received entry from the qualifying draw:
  Alafia Ayeni
  Gage Brymer
  Stefan Dostanic
  Ryan Harrison
  Cannon Kingsley
  Strong Kirchheimer

The following player received entry as a lucky loser:
  Kyle Seelig

Women's singles main draw entrants

Seeds

 1 Rankings are as of 25 July 2022.

Other entrants
The following players received wildcards into the singles main draw:
  Samantha Crawford
  Qavia Lopez
  Madison Sieg
  Aldila Sutjiadi

The following players received entry from the qualifying draw:
  Jessie Aney
  Dalayna Hewitt
     Veronica Miroshnichenko
  Taylor Ng
  Erica Oosterhout
  Adriana Reami
  Peyton Stearns
  Jantje Tilbürger

References

External links
 2022 Lexington Challenger at ITFtennis.com
 2022 Lexington Challenger at ATPtour.com
 Official website

2022
2022 ATP Challenger Tour
2022 ITF Women's World Tennis Tour
2022 in American tennis
August 2022 sports events in the United States